Heteropsis ankaratra is a butterfly in the family Nymphalidae. It is found on Madagascar. The habitat consists of unnatural grassland.

References

Elymniini
Butterflies described in 1870
Endemic fauna of Madagascar
Butterflies of Africa
Taxa named by Christopher Ward (entomologist)